Philippus Zhao Huaiyi (4 October 1880 - 14 October 1927) was a Chinese Roman Catholic Bishop of Roman Catholic Diocese of Beijing, China.

Biography
Zhao was born Zhao Bingyi in Beijing, on October 4, 1880. His father died in the Boxer Rebellion in 1900. Zhao was educated at a Catholic church in Beijing. He was ordained a priest on February 27, 1904. 

On May 10, 1926, he was appointed bishop of the Roman Catholic Diocese of Xuanhua by the Pope Pius XI. He became one of six watched Chinese who were ordained by Pope Pius XI later that year. On October 28, 1926, he and five other Chinese priests (Odoric Cheng Hede, Simon Zhu Kaimin, Hu Ruoshan, Melchior Sun Dezhen, and Chen Guodi) were ordained bishops by Pope Pius XI in Rome. Then they had traveled to France, Belgium and other countries.

He died in Beijing, on October 14, 1927.

References

1880 births
1927 deaths
People from Beijing
20th-century Roman Catholic bishops in China